Charterhouse was a town in the Roman province of Britannia. Its site is located just to the west of the village of Charterhouse-on-Mendip in the English county of Somerset.

Its Latin name may have been Iscalis, but this is far from certain. Based on inscriptions on a pig of Roman lead BRIT. EX. ARG. VEB, meaning "British (lead) from the VEB... lead-silver works", the Roman name has been reconstructed as Vebriacum (with Iscalis more plausibly placed at Cheddar).

It is associated with the Iron Age hill fort, Charterhouse Camp. The Roman landscape has been designated as a Scheduled Ancient Monument.

Mining settlement

The settlement grew up around the north-western edge of prehistoric lead and silver mines, which were exploited by the Romans. Mendip lead ore had up to 0.4% silver content, which the Romans used to pay the army. Extraction is thought to have begun as early as AD 49 (although the evidence of dateable lead ingots found in the neighbourhood has recently been questioned.) At first the lead and silver industries were tightly controlled by the Roman military (in the south-west, by the Second Legion) and there was a small 'fortlet' adjoining the mines during the 1st century, which may, however, have been little more than a fortified compound for storing lead pigs. After a short time, the extraction of these metals was contracted out to civilian companies, probably because of low silver content. Smelting was undertaken on site where industrial workshops have been excavated, and the metal exported along a minor road to the Fosse Way, and probably through a small inland port at nearby Cheddar.

Amphitheatre

An amphitheatre stood west of the settlement. It is the only one in England to exist at a lead mine and is additional evidence of the importance of Mendip lead to the Romans. It measures 32m x 24.4m and the banks for the seating survive 4.5m above the arena. It was surveyed in 1909. It was probably a place of entertainment for the soldiers at the Roman fort which was established here.

See also

Roman engineering
Roman mining
Roman technology

References

History of Somerset
History of mining in the United Kingdom
Roman towns and cities in England
Scheduled monuments in Mendip District
Mendip Hills
Former populated places in Somerset
Amphitheatres in Roman Britain